Dolní Životice is a municipality and village in Opava District in the Moravian-Silesian Region of the Czech Republic. It has about 1,000 inhabitants.

Administrative parts

The village of Hertice is an administrative part of Dolní Životice.

History
The first written mention of Dolní Životice is from 1320. The first written mention of Hertice is from 1251.

References

External links

Villages in Opava District